The 2014–15 Moldovan "A" Division season is the 24th since its establishment. A total of 12 teams are contesting the league.

Teams

League table

Round by round

Results

Top goalscorers

Updated to matches played on 4 June 2015.

References

External links
Divizia A - Moldova - Results, fixtures, tables and news - Soccerway

Moldovan Liga 1 seasons
2
Moldova 2